Ha Baroana is a site in Lesotho noted for its early rock art. The site is located close to Nazareth village, to the east of the capital, Maseru.

References
Fitzpatrick, M., Blond, B., Pitcher, G., Richmond, S., and Warren, M. (2004) South Africa, Lesotho and Swaziland. Footscray, VIC: Lonely Planet.

Geography of Lesotho